Avrohom Genachowsky (also spelled Avraham Genechovsky or Genichovsky; September 1936 – October 11, 2012), was an Orthodox Jewish rabbi and talmudic scholar.

Biography
He was born in Tel Aviv on the first day of Rosh Hashanah, 1936, to Rabbi Eliyahu Moshe and Gitta. Eliyahu Moshe studied at the Lomza Yeshiva where he was a chavrusa with Rabbi Yaakov Kamenetsky and later served as one of the early religious members of the Knesset for HaPoel HaMizrahi.

When Eliyahu Moshe published the Talmud, Rabbi Avrohom Yeshaya Karelitz gave him permission to include his commentaries on the condition that they would be organized by Avrohom, who was 17 at the time. 

Avrohom studied for a short time in Ponevezh Yeshiva, and afterwards in Slabodka Yeshiva. He was fluent in the areas of Choshen Mishpat and Even Ha'ezer. At his father's request, he took the Chief Rabbinate of Israel's test on Choshen Mishpat and earned a mark of 100.

He married Rebbetzin Esther, daughter of Rabbi Refoel Yonah and Baila Bronfeld. Esther was the step-granddaughter of Rabbi Dov Berish Weidenfeld of Chebin (Trzebinia) (Rabbi Refoel Yonah was the son of Rabbi Yosef and Rebbetzin Sarah Bronfeld. After the death of Rabbi Yosef, Sarah married Rabbi Weidenfeld). Rabbi Weidenfeld hired him to teach at his yeshiva, where he remained until his death.

Esther allowed him to remain in Jerusalem all week, returning to home only for Shabbat and holidays.

Works
His first sefer was Cheder Horasi on Horayot, which he wrote in memory of his mother. His students also published some of his chidushim under the title B'nei Re'eim.

Final illness and death
During his final several months, he suffered from pancreatic cancer.

References

1936 births
2012 deaths
Deaths from pancreatic cancer
Israeli Rosh yeshivas
Ponevezh Yeshiva alumni
Slabodka yeshiva alumni